Zhang Mingqi (July 29, 1875 – September 15, 1945) was a Qing Dynasty politician who served as the last Viceroy of Liangguang from April 14 to November 8, 1911. He was born in Shandong province. He supported Yuan Shikai's creation of the Empire of China. Afterwards, he fled to the French concession in Shanghai.

References 

1875 births
1945 deaths
Politicians from Binzhou
Qing dynasty politicians from Shandong
Republic of China politicians from Shandong
Viceroys of Liangguang
Empire of China (1915–1916)